Marsia Alexander-Clarke is an American video installation artist. She is a Guggenheim Fellow.

Personal life and education
Marsia Alexander-Clarke was born in Valparaiso, Chile to United States missionary parents in 1939 and moved to the United States to attend high school in 1952. She obtained her Bachelor of Arts at Park College, and studied at the Art Students League of New York under Ethel Schwabacher from 1962 to 1968. She finalized her education by getting her Master of Fine Arts from Claremont Graduate School in 1974. She lives and works in Altadena, California.

Artistic career

Alexander-Clarke started her artistic career as a sculptor in the 1970s and 80s. Her primary sculptures of this time were called "Nomadic". She would install these sculptures in nature, documenting them and then exhibiting them in galleries calling their gallery placement "dormant." These "nomadic" pieces were made of brown wrapping paper and tape, and eventually out of wood and canvas. Through these works, Alexander-Clarke explored ideas of process art, anthropology, and packaging. In the early 1990s Alexander-Clarke became involved in video art. She was active in Studio X, a production company based in California. In 1997 she had her first video exhibition, S-T-R-E-T-C-H-I-N-G, at El Camino College and the California Museum of Photography. Her work is held in public and private collections, including International Paper.

Notable exhibitions
The Quest for Balance, group show, 1987; Woman's Building, Los Angeles, California
S-T-R-E-T-C-H-I-N-G, 2000; California Museum of Photography, Riverside, California
UT COELUM, 2003; Robert V. Fullerton Art Museum, San Bernardino, California
Marsia Alexander-Clarke and Barbara Berk, 2007; Riverside Art Museum, Riverside, California

References

American women installation artists
American installation artists
Living people
Artists from California
Art Students League of New York alumni
Claremont Graduate University alumni
People from Valparaíso
1939 births
Chilean emigrants to the United States
American video artists
American women video artists
Park University alumni
21st-century American women